Marchisiano da Tolentino (active 1496–1543), also known as Marchisiano di Giorgio da Tolentino,  was an Italian painter, born and active in his native Tolentino, Italy. 
 
He led a tumultuous life, and was pardoned of a murder charge by Pope Julius II. One of his pupils was Giovanni Andrea de Magistris (father of Simone de Magistris), a 16th-century painter from Caldarola. Marchisiano in 1506 painted the frescoes of the Chapel of San Catervo in the Cathedral of Tolentino; these were once attributed to Francesco da Tolentino. He also painted a lunette (1518) for the church of San Nicola, now present in the Museo dell'Opera della Basilica, depicting a Deposition; this was once part of a larger altarpiece.

References

Year of birth unknown
Year of death unknown
16th-century Italian painters
Italian male painters
Italian Renaissance painters